Josef Hickersberger (born 27 April 1948) is a former professional football player and former coach of the Austria national football team and Austrian club side Rapid Wien.

Club career
Hickersberger was born in Amstetten, Austria. He started his playing career with Austria Wien, where he was brought in by Ernst Ocwirk in 1966. After six successful seasons he was sold for 2.1 million schillings to Bundesliga side Kickers Offenbach. He later moved on to Fortuna Düsseldorf, then returned to Austria to join SSW Innsbruck and finished his professional career with Rapid Vienna. He continued playing for amateur sides Badener AC, UFC Pama, SV Forchtenstein and WSV Traisen where he took up his first coaching posts.

International career
Hickersberger made his debut for Austria in May 1968 against Romania and was a participant at the 1978 FIFA World Cup. He earned 39 caps, scoring five goals. His last international match was at the World Cup in 1978 against West Germany, a game dubbed The miracle of Córdoba which Austria won 3–2.

Managerial career
Since retiring as a player, Hickersberger has worked as a football coach. He was the coach of the Austria national team at the 1990 FIFA World Cup in Italy. However, after the sensational and embarrassing 1–0 defeat against the Faroe Islands in the first qualifying game of UEFA Euro 1992, he decided to quit and subsequently coached Fortuna Düsseldorf (1990–1992) and Austria Wien (1993–94).

Hickersberger then worked for a few years in the Middle Eastern region, where he trained several teams, among them the Bahrain national team, and Al Wasl FC Dubai, one of the most popular clubs in the UAE.

In 2002, Hickersberger returned to Austria, and brought back success to Rapid Wien. With him as coach, Rapid won the Austrian Championship of 2004–05, nine years after the last triumph, and accordingly qualified for the UEFA Champions League group stage where Rapid faced the teams of Bayern Munich, Juventus and Club Brugge.

He coached the Austria national team during the UEFA Euro 2008 played in Austria and Switzerland, obtaining only one point out of nine. Austria lost 1–0 against Croatia and Germany, and rescued a late draw, a 1–1 against Poland with a goal of Ivica Vastić on minute 93. Austria stayed in the third position in the Group B, staying out of the competition in their own country. Hickersberger and Joachim Löw were sent off in the match between Austria and Germany after claiming some errors made by Manuel Enrique Mejuto González. On 23 June 2008, he quit the Austria national team post.

On 10 December, Hickersberger signed a contract with Al-Wahda FC (Abu Dhabi) as head coach until 30 June 2009. After finishing fourth, therefore earning a play-off berth in the Asian Champions League, and leading the team to the Etisalat Cup Final in his first year at the club, he signed a one-year extension. He also brought along two of his former national team assistant coaches, including Klaus Lindenberger.

Personal life
Hickersberger's son Thomas played for the Austria national team in 2002.

Career statistics
Scores and results list Austria's goal tally first.

Managerial statistics

1.Statistics includes league and Europe.

Honours

As a player
 Austrian Football Bundesliga: 1968–69, 1969–70, 1981–82
 Austrian Cup: 1968–69, 1970–71, 1978–79

As a manager
 Austrian Cup: 1993–94
 Bahraini Premier League: 1995–96
 Qatari League: 2001–02
 Austrian Football Bundesliga: 2004–05

References

External links
 Josef Hickersberger at Austria Archive 
 Josef Hickersberger at Rapid Archive 
 

1948 births
Living people
People from Amstetten, Lower Austria
Austrian footballers
Austria international footballers
1978 FIFA World Cup players
FK Austria Wien players
Kickers Offenbach players
Fortuna Düsseldorf players
FC Wacker Innsbruck players
SK Rapid Wien players
Austrian Football Bundesliga players
Bundesliga players
Expatriate footballers in West Germany
Austrian expatriate sportspeople in Germany
Austrian expatriate sportspeople in Egypt
Austrian football managers
Austria national football team managers
Fortuna Düsseldorf managers
FK Austria Wien managers
Al-Ahli Club Manama managers
Bahrain national football team managers
Al-Shaab CSC managers
Al-Wasl F.C. managers
Al-Gharafa SC managers
SK Rapid Wien managers
1990 FIFA World Cup managers
UEFA Euro 2008 managers
Expatriate football managers in Bahrain
Austrian expatriate football managers
Association football midfielders
Expatriate football managers in Egypt
Al Mokawloon Al Arab SC managers
Footballers from Lower Austria
Austrian expatriate sportspeople in Bahrain
Austrian expatriate sportspeople in the United Arab Emirates
Austrian expatriate sportspeople in Qatar
Expatriate football managers in the United Arab Emirates
Expatriate football managers in Qatar
Qatar Stars League managers
Egyptian Premier League managers
UAE Pro League managers
Austrian Football Bundesliga managers
Bahraini Premier League managers
Bundesliga managers
Austrian expatriate sportspeople in West Germany
Expatriate football managers in Germany